Sha Tin New Town, or known as Sha Tin-Ma On Shan New Town or Sha Tin Town is one of the satellite towns and new towns of Hong Kong. It is within the Sha Tin District, the New Territories. The New Town covers the neighbourhoods such as Sha Tin, Tai Wai, Fo Tan, Tai Shui Hang, Ma On Shan. The Shing Mun River runs through the middle of the town.

Development history
As of 2004, it has a population of around 640,000 people. The town centre houses a mall, New Town Plaza, the Sha Tin Public Library, Sha Tin Town Hall, and other community facilities.

Transport

Highways, roads and tunnels
The road transport between Shatin and Kowloon relies on the Lion Rock Tunnel (completed in 1967), Tate's Cairn Tunnel (completed in 1988), Shing Mun Tunnel, and Tai Po Road. The Tolo Highway was opened in September 1985. It connects Sha Tin Road and Tai Po Road, forming a connection system between the New Town and Tai Po New Town. Tate's Cairn Highway also connects Ma On Shan with Tolo Highway. The opening of Sai Sha Road in October 1988 provided a connection between Sha Tin and Sai Kung. The T3 Highway (Tsing Sha Highway) and Route No. 8 (Cheung Sha Wan to Sha Tin section) was completed in March 2008.

Public transport
The New Town has numerous bus routes connecting to the city centre and metro station from various populated zone in the Town. Beside bus services, minibus services are provided as well for residential areas with fewer people.

KCR (now East Rail line, MTR)
KCR, since merged with the former MTR, was essential to the development of new town. There are five East Rail line stations within the new town, namely Tai Wai, Sha Tin, Fo Tan, Racecourse and University (Chinese University). Part of the Tuen Ma line also lies within the district, which connects Hin Keng (situated at the southwestern part of Tai Wai) and Wu Kai Sha of Ma On Shan (situated at the northeastern part of Lee On Estate). Passengers can transfer to East Rail line at Tai Wai station.

Urban planning
Despite Sha Tin New Town including Ma On Shan, and the town itself is sometimes known as Sha Tin-Ma On Shan, Ma On Shan town has its own urban planning plan or Outline Zoning Plan (OZP), the "Ma On Shan Outline Zoning Plan". The plan was amended most recently in 2020. Neighbourhoods such as Sha Tin, Tai Wai, Fo Tan are included in the "Sha Tin Outline Zoning Plan".

The Science Park-Pak Shek Kok development, also located in Sha Tin New Town, has its own OZP too, but part of the area of that development is included in Tai Po District.

References

Further reading

External links

1970s establishments in Hong Kong
Sha Tin District
New towns in Hong Kong
New towns started in the 1970s